Jnātrdhārmakathāh is the sixth of the 12 Jain āgamas said to be promulgated by Māhavīra himself. Jnātrdhārmakathāh translated as "Stories of Knowledge and Righteousness" is said to have been composed by Ganadhara Sudharmaswami as per the Śvetámbara tradition.

Subject matter of the Agama
It contains a series of narratives, from which morals about results of following the religious path are drawn. The Eighth Chapter gives the story of Lady Mallinatha the nineteenth Tirthankara, or according to the Digambara Jain, Lord Mallinatha.

English translations
Popular English Translations are  :-
Illustrated SRI JNATADHARMAKATHANGA SUTRA in 2 volumes Prakrit Gatha - Hindi  exposition - English exposition and Appendices Ed. by Pravartaka Amar Muni, Shrichand Surana Saras, Eng. tr. by Surendra Bothra

References

Jain texts
Agamas